Senator Davies may refer to:

Elmer David Davies (1899–1957), Tennessee State Senate
John T. Davies (politician) (born 1932), Minnesota State Senate
William T. Davies (1831–1912), Pennsylvania State Senate
William Davies (Georgia judge) (1775–1829), Georgia State Senate

See also
Senator Davis (disambiguation)